Cusson may refer to:

 Cusson, Minnesota, an unincorporated community in Leiding Township, Saint Louis County, Minnesota, United States
 Gabriel Cusson (1903–1972), Canadian composer and music educator
 Jean Cusson (born 1942), Canadian professional ice hockey player
 Matt Cusson (fl. 2000–2011), contemporary jazz artist
 Pierre Cusson (1727–1783), French botanist

See also 
 Cussons (disambiguation)